Freaky Stories is a Canadian animated anthology television series, which was originally broadcast by YTV in English and Canal Famille in French (five-minute versions using the French title Frissons). It is an animated show about urban legends hosted by two animatronic puppets, Larry de Bug, a cockroach, (voiced by James Rankin) and his gooey sidekick, Maurice the maggot (voiced by Dan Redican) in Ted's Diner - a 1940s-era diner setting staffed by Rosie the waitress (voiced by Jayne Eastwood, but never seen - season 1 only). It was often part of The Three Friends and Jerry when it aired on Fox Family.

Premise
The series, described as "a Twilight Zone for kids", centers on the kind of myths and legends that are told as scary campfire or bedtime stories. Every episode always starts with and finishes with the phrase: "This is a true story, and it happened to a friend of a friend of mine." and by the words of Larry, "Just because they never happened, doesn't mean they ain't true." Animation styles and musical scoring varied within each half-hour episode, incorporating 20 different looks in the first season alone. The short stories and changing styles were specifically designed to keep viewers' attention span.

Production
Series creator Steve Schnier successfully pitched his concept of modern urban legends to YTV in 1991.  In 1994, Steve teamed with executive producer John Delmage. The resulting Freaky Stories pilot premiered during YTV's "Dark Night 3" Halloween block on October 28, 1995, and the series itself premiered as a one-hour special as part of "Dark Night 5" on October 24, 1997. While most episodes were finished on digibeta, the pilot was shot on film using traditional animation techniques but completed on video.  The subsequent series was digitally inked, painted and composited.

Cast
 James Rankin - Larry de bug
 Dan Redican - Maurice the Maggot

Additional narrator cast
Pam Hyatt
Sahrla Bonneville
Ben Campbell
Jonathan Wilson
Juan Chioran
Diego Matamoros
Susan Roman
Adrian Truss
Lisa Yamanaka
Tara Meyer
Stephanie Morgenstern
Don Francks
Nadine Rabinovitch
Nigel Bennett
Denis Akiyama
Ruby Smith-Merovitz
Jennifer Dodge
Tanja Jacobs
Rick Jones
Dan Hennessey
Chris Wiggins
Emilie-Claire Barlow
Diane D'Aquila
Debbie Murphy
Maryke Hendrikse
Neil Crone
Catherine Disher
Alyson Court
Robert Bockstael
Marnie McPhail
Alison Sealy-Smith
Linda Kash
Maurice Dean Wint

Episodes

Season 1 (1997–1998)
Episode 1: The Big Queasy - October 24, 1997
 Prison Break/Cat Food/Weenie Wonderland/Mixed Nuts
Episode 2: Boys and Ghouls - October 31, 1997 
 A Shot in the Dark/First Kiss/Blind Date/The Suspect
Episode 3: Animal Maggotism - November 7, 1997
 The Resurrection of Fluffy/Fifi to Go/Bug in the Ear/The Flying Kitten
Episode 4: Take This Job and Love It - November 14, 1997
 Pizza Guy/Carpet Man/Out of the Blue/Blunder Bed
Episode 5: Designer Tales - November 21, 1997
 Diet Pill/Spiders in the Hairdo/The Fly/Hanging by a Thread
Episode 6: Boo! - November 28, 1997 
 Snatched/Graveyard Wager/Puddle and the Glow Monster/The Vampire
Episode 7: When You Gotta Go You Gotta Go - December 5, 1997
 Locked Out at 20,000/The $50 Porsche/The Bunker/A Concrete Cadillac
Episode 8: Law and Disorder - December 12, 1997
 The Rug Bug/Cat-Napping/Free Gas/The Hook
Episode 9: Not the Waltons - December 19, 1997
 Black Bean Soup/Bottle of Wine/To Pee or Not to Pee/Break a Leg
Episode 10: Oops! December 26, 1997
 The Moving Cactus/The Mystery Smell/Fetch the Ball/Accidental Cannibals
Episode 11: Gotcha! January 2, 1998
 Dumb Waiter/Luggage/Mama Mia/Jaxx in the Box
Episode 12: School Daze January 9, 1998
 Field Trip/The Story/Panty Raid/The Experiment
Episode 13: End of the Day January 16, 1998
 The Flower Lady/The Bookkeeper/Voice From Within/Pig Story

Season 2 (1998–1999)
Episode 14/1: Dog From Mexico/The Mortician's Daughter/Pigeon Dave/Hair Today, Gone... - October 23, 1998 
Episode 15/2: Murray and the Rats/Safe at Home/The Gift/Maple Syrup - October 30, 1998 
Episode 16/3: Last Cab Fare/Nude in the RV/Alligator in the Sewer/Do Unto Others - November 6, 1998
Episode 17/4: Stolen Lunchbox/Front Row Seats/The Vanishing/Dead Man Walking- November 13, 1998 
Episode 18/5: Radar Benny/Battleship/Severed Digit/Photo Op - November 20, 1998 
Episode 19/6: Last Call/Identical Twins/Bat Girl/The Nosy Maid- November 27, 1998 
Episode 20/7: Apologies to Steinbeck/The Creeping Curse of the Mummy's Tomb/A Fishy Story/Dumped in the Outback - December 4, 1998 
Episode 21/8: Traders/Court in the Act/Furd and the Veep/Mooching Roommate - December 11, 1998
Episode 22/9: The Iron Fist Principal/Field of Seeds/Last Laugh/The Immortal Osgood Toadworthy - December 18, 1998
Episode 23/10: The Need For Speed/Zit's A Horrible Life/The Girl With the Hoarky Cough/The Smell of Fear - December 25, 1998
Episode 24/11: Pirates/Choc-Roaches/Femme Fatale/Dear Mother and Father - January 1, 1999
Episode 25/12: The Boy Who Cried Alien/Did You Have Fun At The Party?/The Rich Fart/Sewer Swimming Hole - January 8, 1999
Episode 26/13: The Man Who Picked His Brain/The Big Question/Smelly Kelly/Go Find Something To Do, Kid! - January 15, 1999

Season 3 (1999)
Episode 27/1: Deep Forest Diver/Double Your Pleasure/Prize/Hokus Pokus - October 22, 1999
Episode 28/2: Long Long Distance Call/Sweet Dreams/Duelling Sisters/Stuck Face - October 29, 1999
Episode 29/3: The 13th Floor/Fishing Hole/Bean Boy/Rugs R Us - November 5, 1999
Episode 30/4: Mark IV/Invisible Shirley/Chatty Monk/Mouse in the House - November 12, 1999
Episode 31/5: So Long Sing Sing/Fountain of Youth/Ouija Board/Houston, We Have a Problem - November 19, 1999
Episode 32/6: At the Circus/The Genius/Which Witch is Which?/Loch Ness Incident - November 26, 1999
Episode 33/7: Sour Puss/Monkey's Paw/First Anniversary/Bagel Boy - December 3, 1999
Episode 34/8: The Getaway/The Babysitter/The Meal/Wax Museum - December 10, 1999
Episode 35/9: Mouse Trap/Monkey Shines/A Little Push/The Lodger - December 17, 1999

References

External links

1997 Canadian television series debuts
1999 Canadian television series endings
1990s Canadian animated television series
1990s Canadian anthology television series
1990s Canadian science fiction television series
Canadian children's animated anthology television series
Canadian children's animated horror television series
Canadian children's animated science fantasy television series
Canadian television shows featuring puppetry
English-language television shows
Television series about urban legends
Television series by DHX Media
YTV (Canadian TV channel) original programming
Fox Family Channel original programming
Television shows filmed in Ottawa
Television shows filmed in Toronto